A by-election was held for the New South Wales Legislative Assembly electorate of The Glebe on 17 February 1865 because Thomas Smart had been appointed Colonial Treasurer in the fourth Cowper ministry. Such ministerial by-elections were usually uncontested however on this occasion a poll was required in East Sydney (Charles Cowper), The Glebe and  West Sydney (John Darvall and John Robertson). Each minister was comfortably re-elected. Only The Paterson (William Arnold) was uncontested.

Daniel Dalgleish was a former member for West Sydney who was defeated at the election on 24 November 1864. He was then an unsuccessful candidate at the elections for The Glebe (29 November 1864) and Goldfields South (10 January 1865). The day after his loss here, Dalgelish was again unsuccessful at the West Sydney by-election (18 February 1865), which was the final occasion on which he stood for parliament.

Dates

Result

Thomas Smart was appointed Colonial Treasurer in the fourth Cowper ministry.

See also

List of New South Wales state by-elections

References

1865 elections in Australia
New South Wales state by-elections
1860s in New South Wales